Abdus Sattar is a Bangladeshi politician and former member of parliament. He was elected from Tangail-1 (Madhupur and Dhanbari) constituency as a Jatiya Samajtantrik Dal candidate in the first Bangladeshi parliamentary election held on 7 March 1973.

In the election, he defeated Bangladesh Awami League candidate Mahendra Lal Barman by a margin of 5,000 votes.

References

Jatiya Samajtantrik Dal politicians
1st Jatiya Sangsad members